Rooms of the Magnificent is the second solo album by Australian guitarist and songwriter Ed Kuepper recorded in 1986 and released on the Hot label. The album reunited Kuepper with members of the Laughing Clowns and featured pianist Chris Abrahams of The Necks.

Described as Kuepper's most accessible album to date, the first single, "Also Sprach the King of Eurodisco", received strong airplay on national broadcaster Triple J and some on commercial radio.

Track listing
All compositions by Ed Kuepper
 "Rooms of the Magnificent" – 2:36
 "Also Sprach the King of Eurodisco" – 4:52
 "Sea Air" – 3:25
 "The Sixteen Days – 3:14
 "Without Your Mirror" – 3:58
 "No Point in Working" – 2:53
 "I Am Your Prince" – 2:44
 "Spent Five Years" – 1:57
 "Show Pony" – 5:01
 "Nothing You Can Do" – 3:07

Charts

Personnel
Ed Kuepper – vocals, electric guitar, acoustic guitar 
Paul Smith – bass
Mark Dawson – drums, percussion
Michael Arthur – harmonica
Melanie Oxley – backing vocals
Chris Abrahams – piano, organ
Glad Reed – trombone
Diane Spence – saxophone
Kathy Wemyss – trumpet
Technical
Mick Olesh - recording engineer
Alana Sowman, Mick Olesh - mixing engineer
Judi Dransfield - cover art and layout

References

Hot Records albums
Ed Kuepper albums
1986 albums